Hopvatnet is a lake in the municipality of Steigen in Nordland county, Norway. The lake is located just above sea level and it empties into the nearby Nordfolda branch of the Folda fjord.

See also
List of lakes in Norway

References

Steigen
Lakes of Nordland